Royall Cotton Mill Commissary is a historic commercial building associated with the Royall Mill and located at Wake Forest, Wake County, North Carolina.  It built in 1900, and is a two-story, rectangular brick building with a low gabled metal roof and stepped parapet.  It measures 32 feet by 100 feet and has segmental arched windows.  The Royall Cotton Mill Commissary closed in 1934. The building has been rehabilitate into apartments.

It was listed on the National Register of Historic Places in 1991.  It is located in the Glen Royall Mill Village Historic District.

References 

Commercial buildings on the National Register of Historic Places in North Carolina
Commercial buildings completed in 1900
Buildings and structures in Wake County, North Carolina
National Register of Historic Places in Wake County, North Carolina
Historic district contributing properties in North Carolina